Spathiphyllum cochlearispathum is a plant species in the family Araceae. It is native to southern Mexico and often cultivated.  When cultivated as a houseplant, Spathiphyllum cochlearispathum is commonly called peace lily.

Taxonomic history
The species was originally described by Frederik Michael Liebmann in a separate genus Hydnostachyon, which he described as having a concave (spoon-like) spathe Spatha foliacea persistens cochleariformis, from which he formed the species epithet cochlearispathum. The species was moved to the genus Spathiphyllum by Heinrich Gustav Adolf Engler.

Care instructions 
Water only once soil is dry and the plant begins to wilt, then saturate the soil.  The peace lily likes light, but absolutely no direct sunlight, not even for short periods.

References

Taxonomic info at Uniprot

cochlearispathum
Endemic flora of Mexico
House plants
Plants described in 1849